The Persian ratsnake (Zamenis persicus) is a species of medium-sized nonvenomous snake in the family Colubridae. The species is endemic to Western Asia.

Geographic range
Z. persicus is found in temperate northwestern Iran and Azerbaijan, in the area near the Caspian Sea.

Description
Males seem to grow larger than females.

Taxonomy
Z. persicus has habits very similar to Z. situla and for many years it was considered a subspecies of Elaphe longissima. It was granted full species status in 1984 (Nilson and Andrén).

Behavior
The Persian ratsnake is principally regarded as a terrestrial species, spending most of its time in the leaf litter; however, it is also an agile climber and will mount low brush.

Diet
The diet of Z. persicus, like that of most colubrids, consists primarily of small mammals, but it may also eat other small reptiles and amphibians.

Reproduction
Sexually mature female Persian ratsnakes lay clutches of 4-8 eggs, which hatch after 45–55 days of incubation.

In captivity
For Z. persicus, a hibernation period of 2–3 months is recommended.

References

Further reading
Werner F. (1913). "Neue oder seltene Reptilien und Frösche des Naturhistorischen Museums in Hamburg ". Mitteilungen aus dem Naturhistorischen Museum in Hamburg 30: 1-51. (Coluber longissimus var. persica, pp. 23–24). (in German).

External links
Ratsnakes.com

Rat snakes
Ratsnake, Persian
Ratsnake, Persian
Reptiles described in 1913